The District Attorney of Los Angeles County  is in charge of the office that prosecutes felony and misdemeanor crimes that occur within Los Angeles County, California, United States. The current district attorney (DA) is George Gascón. 

Some misdemeanor crimes are prosecuted by local city attorneys. City attorneys prosecute misdemeanors and infractions that are violations of the municipal code governing incorporated cities, such as Los Angeles and Long Beach, within the county. All other felony and misdemeanors within Los Angeles County are prosecuted by the district attorney's office. According to the district attorney's official website, the office is the largest local prosecutor's office in the United States. The Los Angeles County Public Defender provides legal assistance to individuals charged with a crime who are financially unable to hire and pay for their own private lawyers.

List of district attorneys

See also

 San Diego County District Attorney
 San Francisco District Attorney's Office

References

External links

 
District Attorney
1852 establishments in California